José María Núñez Urrezola (born 22 January 1952) is a Spanish former professional football manager and former player who played as a left back.

He amassed La Liga totals of 197 games and two goals over the course of 11 seasons, ten with Athletic Bilbao.

Club career
Born in Tolosa, Gipuzkoa, Núñez was a youth product of Athletic Bilbao, and made his senior debut with the reserve team in 1971. He was promoted to the main squad two years later, but only appeared in five La Liga matches in his first three seasons, his debut in the competition coming on 7 September 1974 in a 0–2 away loss against CD Málaga.

After two years with Sporting de Gijón on loan, the first spent in Segunda División, Núñez returned to his previous club in the summer of 1978, going on to be regularly played during his eight-year tenure in his second spell. From 1982 to 1984, as the Lions won back to back national championships, he contributed a total of 50 appearances, also playing the full 90 minutes in the final of the 1984 Copa del Rey which was won at the expense of FC Barcelona (1–0).

After spending the 1986–87 and 1987–88 campaigns in the second tier with Sestao Sport Club, Núñez retired at the age of 36. Immediately after retiring, he was named manager of SD Amorebieta.

Honours
Athletic Bilbao
La Liga: 1982–83, 1983–84
Copa del Rey: 1983–84; Runner-up 1984–85
Supercopa de España: 1984 (Athletic Bilbao were awarded the trophy as winners of the double)

Sporting Gijón
Segunda División: 1976–77

References

External links

1952 births
Living people
People from Tolosa, Spain
Spanish footballers
Footballers from the Basque Country (autonomous community)
Association football defenders
La Liga players
Segunda División players
Tercera División players
Bilbao Athletic footballers
Athletic Bilbao footballers
Sporting de Gijón players
Sestao Sport Club footballers
Spanish football managers
SD Amorebieta managers